Zakarya Bergdich (born 7 January 1989) is a professional footballer who plays as a left-back for Turkish club Erzurumspor. Born in France, he represents Morocco at full international level, and played at the 2012 Summer Olympics.

Club career
Bergdich started his career at UJA Alfortville, and went on to represent RC Lens in his country. In 2013, he moved abroad, signing for Real Valladolid.

On 23 July 2015, Bergdich joined Charlton from Valladolid for an undisclosed fee, signing a four-year deal. He scored his first goal for the club in a 4–1 League Cup win over Dagenham & Redbridge on 11 August 2015.

On 28 August 2016, Bergdich returned to Spain, signing a one-year contract with Córdoba CF.

Career statistics

Honours
Morocco U23
CAF U-23 Championship runner-up: 2011

References

External links

1989 births
People from Compiègne
Sportspeople from Oise
Footballers from Hauts-de-France
French sportspeople of Moroccan descent
Living people
French footballers
Moroccan footballers
Morocco international footballers
Association football defenders
UJA Maccabi Paris Métropole players
RC Lens players
Real Valladolid players
Genoa C.F.C. players
Charlton Athletic F.C. players
Córdoba CF players
FC Sochaux-Montbéliard players
Belenenses SAD players
Denizlispor footballers
Büyükşehir Belediye Erzurumspor footballers
Championnat National 2 players
Ligue 1 players
Ligue 2 players
La Liga players
Segunda División players
Serie A players
English Football League players
Championnat National 3 players
Primeira Liga players
Süper Lig players
2013 Africa Cup of Nations players
Olympic footballers of Morocco
Footballers at the 2012 Summer Olympics
French expatriate footballers
Moroccan expatriate footballers
Expatriate footballers in Spain
French expatriate sportspeople in Spain
Moroccan expatriate sportspeople in Spain
Expatriate footballers in Italy
French expatriate sportspeople in Italy
Moroccan expatriate sportspeople in Italy
Expatriate footballers in England
French expatriate sportspeople in England
Moroccan expatriate sportspeople in England
Expatriate footballers in Portugal
French expatriate sportspeople in Portugal
Moroccan expatriate sportspeople in Portugal
Expatriate footballers in Turkey
French expatriate sportspeople in Turkey
Moroccan expatriate sportspeople in Turkey